EarthWeb is a science fiction novel by American writer Marc Stiegler, released in May, 1999 by Baen Books.
EarthWeb is set in a future where Earth is attacked every five years by a large spaceship from an unknown source.  Named Shivas (after the Hindu Deity of the same name) the ships are very large, crewed by robots and become progressively more advanced.  The ultimate goal of the ships seems to be the complete destruction of all people on Earth.

Commando squads of highly trained heroes (called Angels) infiltrate and attempt to destroy each Shiva, using information gathered by an extended, worldwide version of the internet.

An important facet of the web are sites called 'castpoints' (from 'forecast') where people can bet money on each Shiva's layout and how to deal with all kinds of problems the Angels encounter inside the ship. The betting system makes sure that good ideas rise to the top (they are betted on the most) and people who are good at picking good ideas win more money (so they can back the next good idea with more strength).

References

External links
 scifi.com review 

1999 novels
1999 science fiction novels
Alien invasions in novels